The 1938–39 Cypriot First Division was the 5th season of the Cypriot top-level football league.

Overview
It was contested by 7 teams, and APOEL F.C. won the championship.

League standings

Results

References
Cyprus - List of final tables (RSSSF)

Cypriot First Division seasons
Cypriot
1938–39 in Cypriot football